Oh Ban-Suk (born 20 May 1988) is a South Korean footballer who plays as a centre-back for Incheon United.

In May 2018 he was named in South Korea's preliminary 28-man squad for the 2018 FIFA World Cup in Russia.

Career statistics

Club
Updated to 4 December 2021.

Honours

Individual 
 K League Classic Best XI : 2017

References

External links
 

https://th.soccerway.com/players/ban-suk-oh/178351/

1988 births
Living people
Association football defenders
South Korean footballers
South Korean expatriate footballers
South Korea international footballers
Jeju United FC players
Al-Wasl F.C. players
Oh Ban-suk
K League 1 players
UAE Pro League players
Oh Ban-suk
People from Gwacheon
Konkuk University alumni
2018 FIFA World Cup players
Expatriate footballers in the United Arab Emirates
Expatriate footballers in Thailand
South Korean expatriate sportspeople in the United Arab Emirates
South Korean expatriate sportspeople in Thailand
Sportspeople from Gyeonggi Province